Nicolaas Peter Vanos (April 13, 1963 – August 16, 1987) was an American professional basketball player for the Phoenix Suns of the National Basketball Association. The San Mateo, California, native was selected 32nd by the Suns in the 1985 NBA draft, after playing for Hillsdale High School and collegiately at Santa Clara University. He played for the Suns as a center on the team.

His career with the Suns lasted only two years before his death. On August 16, 1987, Vanos and his fiancée, Carolyn Cohen, boarded Northwest Airlines Flight 255, after visiting his fiancée's parents, for a trip to Phoenix, Arizona. The plane crashed after takeoff from the Detroit Metropolitan Airport in Romulus, Michigan, killing 154 passengers and crew, including Vanos and his fiancée, as well as two motorists.

See also
List of basketball players who died during their careers

References

External links 

1963 births
1987 deaths
Accidental deaths in Michigan
American men's basketball players
American people of Dutch descent
Basketball players from California
Centers (basketball)
People from San Mateo, California
Phoenix Suns draft picks
Phoenix Suns players
Santa Clara Broncos men's basketball players
Victims of aviation accidents or incidents in 1987
Victims of aviation accidents or incidents in the United States